Sunset Peak, also known as Romesh Thong, is a mountain massif with a peak elevation of , located on the border of the Poonch and Shopian districts of Jammu and Kashmir. Sunset Peak, as the name suggests, lies to the west of the Kashmir valley. It is located 40 km west of Shopian town and 105 km southwest of Srinagar, the summer capital of Jammu and Kashmir.

Mountaineering
Early exploration of the Pirpanjal Range was carried by Thomas Montgomerie and Godwin Austen in 1856. The first ascent of the summit was made in 1901 by Dr Arthur Neve and Dr Ernest Neve, the British brothers who took the route via Yusmarg Konsar Nag and climbed the summit through north face.

The Mughal Road passes through the base of this mountain which lies on the right side of the road.

References

Climbing areas of India
Mountains of Jammu and Kashmir
Shopian district